Oligyrtus or Oligyrtos ( or Ὀλόγυρτος) was a fortress situated on a mountain of the same name in a pass between Stymphalus and Caphyae.

References

Populated places in ancient Arcadia
Former populated places in Greece
Lost ancient cities and towns